The 2016 elections for the Pennsylvania State Senate were held on November 8, 2016, with all odd-numbered districts being contested. Primary elections were held on April 26, 2016. The term of office for those elected in 2016 will begin when the Senate convenes in January 2017. Pennsylvania State Senators are elected to four-year terms, with 25 of the 50 seats contested every two years.

Republicans have controlled the chamber since the 1994 election ( years on election day).

Overview

Special election
A special election was held on April 26, 2016, to fill the vacancy created by the resignation of Dominic Pileggi on January 5, 2016, after his election to a county judgeship.

General election

Source:

References

2016 Pennsylvania elections
Pennsylvania State Senate elections
Pennsylvania Senate